Kirill "Kyle" Vashkulat (born July 24, 1990 in Kyiv, Ukraine) is a judoka from the United States.

Biography
Kyle was born in the capital city of Ukraine, Kyiv. When he was 9 years old, he moved to the United States.

Judo
Vashkulat is still young to have some great achievements. His current biggest success is a bronze medal from 2010 Pan American Judo Championships.

Achievements

References

External links 
 
 US Judo
 Facebook

American male judoka
Living people
1990 births
Judoka at the 2011 Pan American Games
Judoka at the 2012 Summer Olympics
Olympic judoka of the United States
Ukrainian emigrants to the United States
Pan American Games competitors for the United States